2014 Virsligas Winter Cup is second the edition of Virsligas Winter Cup. FC Daugava is the defending champion.

Group stage

Group A

Group B

Knockout places

Seventh place

Fifth place

Third place

Final

References

Virsligas Winter Cup
Virsligas Winter Cup